Kelvin Ibruvwe or Kelvin Oniarah mononymously known as Kelvin is a Nigerian kidnapper. He was arrested on 25 September 2013 by a joint team of the Nigerian army and Department of State Security Services.

References 

Nigerian gangsters
Nigerian kidnappers
Nigerian people convicted of murder
People convicted of murder by Nigeria